is a Japanese novel written Ryō Wada and published by Shinchosha in May 2008. A manga adaptation illustrated by Mutsumi Banno was serialized in Shogakukan's Monthly Shōnen Sunday from May 2009 to February 2011. A live-action film, Mumon: The Land of Stealth, premiered in Japan in July 2017.

Media

Novel
Ryō Wada's Shinobi no Kuni novel was published by Shinchosha on May 30, 2008.

Manga
A manga adaptation illustrated by Mutsumi Banno was serialized in Shogakukan's Monthly Shōnen Sunday from May 12, 2009 to February 12, 2011. Shogakukan collected its chapters in four tankōbon volumes, released from December 12, 2009 to March 11, 2011. An additional fifth volume was released by Shogakukan, containing anthology stories that were never serialized, on June 12, 2017. It includes collaboration from Banno, Ashibi Fukui, Kōnosuke Saeki, Hayato Asaki, Hiko and Yuto Sano. The manga was licensed in Indonesia by Elex Media Komputindo.

Volume list

Live-action film

A live-action film adaptation of the novel, titled Mumon: The Land of Stealth, premiered in Japan on July 1, 2017.

References

External links
 

2008 Japanese novels
Historical anime and manga
Japanese historical novels
Shinchosha books
Shogakukan manga
Shōnen manga